The Ironman Award was awarded annually since 1989 by the International Hockey League to the player who played in all his team's games while displaying outstanding offensive and defensive abilities.

Winners

References
Ironman Award www.hockeydb.com

International Hockey League (1945–2001) trophies